God Is Brazilian is a 2003 Brazilian comedy-drama film directed and co-written by Carlos Diegues, based on a story by João Ubaldo Ribeiro. In the film, God, portrayed by Antônio Fagundes, decides to take a vacation and heads to northeastern Brazil to find a saint as a replacement.

Plot
Taoca, a part-time fisherman and small-time con artist, finds a man holding on to a buoy in the middle of the ocean. The man claims he is God, but Taoca doesn't believe him until he performs some miracles.

It seems God has decided to take a break and is searching for someone to temporarily take over. With Taoca, God travels the country in hopes of finding a new saint who is fit for the job. Along the way, they meet a woman, Madá, who joins the two in hopes they will take her to São Paulo, where her mother has died.

Eventually, the trio comes across a young man who appears to have the right qualifications, except he has no belief in a higher power.

Cast
Antônio Fagundes as God
Wagner Moura as Taoca
Paloma Duarte as Madá
Hugo Carvana as Quincas Batalha
Stepan Nercessian as Baudelé
Bruce Gomlevsky as Quinca das Mulas
Castrinho as Goró
Chico de Assis as Cezão
Thiago Farias as Messias
Susana Werner as Senhorita Agá
Toni Garrido as São Pedro
Cordel do Fogo Encantado

References

External links

2003 films
2003 comedy-drama films
2003 fantasy films
2000s fantasy comedy-drama films
2000s Portuguese-language films
2000s road comedy-drama films
Brazilian fantasy comedy-drama films
Columbia Pictures films
Films about God
Films directed by Carlos Diegues